"Lara Fabian" is the fourth studio album and the first English-language album by pop singer Lara Fabian. It was first released on 29 November 1999 in France and was released worldwide in 2000. The album features the hit singles "I Will Love Again", "I Am Who I Am" and "Love by Grace".

Album information
After the Francophone star's huge success, in 1998 and 1999, Lara went to New York City and San Francisco to record her first album in English.  She wrote or co-wrote most of the songs, working with Rick Allison and producers Walter Afanasieff (Mariah Carey, Céline Dion, Michael Bolton), Patrick Leonard (Madonna), Sam Watters (Color Me Badd, Jessica Simpson, Anastacia) and Mark Taylor (Cher, Enrique Iglesias).

Produced by Sony Music, the self-titled album was launched in May 2000 on America's most popular morning television show, NBC's Today Show. Invitations poured in, and Lara Fabian appeared on The Tonight Show, The View, Access Hollywood, Craig Kilborn, and Entertainment Tonight.

The album's first excerpt, "I Will Love Again", hit No. 1 on the Billboard Dance Music charts and settled in for 58 weeks.
Thanks to this resounding success, she received the Félix for Quebec Artist Having the Most Impact in a Language other than French.

From June 2000 to February 2001, the song "Love by Grace" became the theme song of the lead couple in the Brazilian soap opera Laços de Família, broadcast by Rede Globo for millions of viewers in Brazil and Portugal.  For several weeks, the song was number 1 on most Brazilian and Portuguese radio stations.  "Love by Grace" generated an incredible frenzy around the artist.

After From Lara with Love, her first American TV special broadcast by PBS, the singer-songwriter participated in the very popular WTKU New York radio special, Miracle on 34th Street, where many popular artists appeared, including Michael Jackson, Christina Aguilera, Marc Anthony, Ricky Martin and Toni Braxton.

Shortly after, when her self-titled English-language album was released in Asia, Lara scored a number one hit on the Taiwanese top ten, a great moment for the artist.  Many were particularly impressed with the song "Light of my Life" (found only on the Asian edition of the album), which she interpreted with Leehom Wang, Asia's top male Chinese-speaking vocalist. This song was included in the movie feature China Strike Force, starring newcomer Lee-Horn along with Aaron Kwok, a box-office idol throughout Asia.

Eagerly awaited in several cities throughout the world, Lara dealt with her growing popularity by frequently appearing abroad.  Fans and critics questioned her promotional tactics, however, as she neglected the US market in favor of a European tour, where she had already solidified her popularity. In 2001, promotion of "Lara Fabian" slowed significantly and a third single was not released. Lara has been absent from the US music landscape since that time.

There are many different international versions of this album.  There is a version each for Canada, France, Japan, America, and South America.  The albums vary greatly from each other because of different song tracks or cover artwork.

The song "Till I Get Over You" was produced by the duo Louis Biancaniello and Sam Watters, who became the producer team behind the sound of the initial hits for American female singer Anastacia.  One can see the similarities in sound and production between Lara's "Till I Get Over You" and Anastacia's "I'm Outta Love" on Anastacia's 2000 debut album "Not That Kind".

The songs "Adagio" and "Broken Vow" were covered by Filipino singers, Mark Bautista and Sarah Geronimo. Also Josh Groban covered "Broken Vow" for his 2003 album "Closer", and Lebanese singer Majida El Roumi sang an Arabic cover of "Adagio", titled "Habibi", for her 2006 album "E'tazalt El Gharam".

Kazakh singer, Dimash Kudaibergen (Kazakh: Дінмұхаммед Қанатұлы Құдайберген, Dinmuhammed Qanatuly Qudaıbergen), who also works now with Igor Krutoy, sang "Adagio" in his "wild card" entry performance in 2017 on the Chinese talent competition, I Am Singer, which catapulted him to world-wide notice, also performing it on the US show The World's Best (controversially withdrawing due to, against his contractual stipulations, being placed to compete against much younger performers, which is much against his Kazakh cultural tradition of always supporting and encouraging youth). In 2019, he and Lara performed together in a concerts with Igor Krutoy.

Both versions of "Adagio" and the song "To Love Again (Si Tu M'Aimes)" feature Steve Lukather guitar solos.

Singles chart performances
 United States Billboard Chart Albums (2000):
 The Billboard Heatseeker Chart : #1
 The Billboard 200 Albums Chart : #85

 United States Billboard Chart Singles (2000):

 I Will Love Again:

 The Billboard Hot 100 Singles : #32
 The Billboard Hot Dance Music/Club Play : #1
 The Billboard Hot Dance Music/Club Play Maxi Singles Sales : #2
 The Billboard Adult Contemporary Chart : #10
 The Billboard Top 40 Mainstream : #24

 Love by Grace:

 The Billboard Adult Contemporary Chart: #25
 Brazil Hot 100 Airplay: #1 (26 weeks)

 Belgian Singles Chart (Flanders):
 Adagio: #29

 Belgian Singles Chart (Wallonia):
 Adagio: #3

 Canadian Singles Chart:
 I Will Love Again:
 Canadian Singles Chart: #4

 Dutch Singles Chart:
 Adagio: #66

 Eurochart Hot 100 Singles Chart:
 Adagio: #26

 New Zealand Singles Chart:
 I Will Love Again: #8

 UK Singles Chart:
 I Will Love Again: #63

Awards and achievements

  Gold Album: Canada, Germany, Switzerland, Norway
  Platinum Album: Belgium, Brazil and France
  Triple Platinum Album: Portugal
 "World Music Award" for "Best Selling Benelux Artist" (Belgium, Netherlands, Luxembourg)

Track listing

Production and Personnel (as adapted from liner notes)
Tracks 1, 6 and 13 produced by Rick Allison; co-produced by Dave Pickell.  Recorded by Jay Healy, Mario Brillion, Jeff Caruthers and John Kurlander; assisted by Ethan Shofer, Ian Dalsemer, Steve Baughman, Peter Doell, Dann Thompson, Andy Magnanello (Manganello on track 1 only) and David Channing (Channing on track 13 only).  Mixed by Jay Healy, with assistance on track 6 by Gordon Fordyce.  Rick Allison and Dave Pickell: Keyboards and Programming; Steve Lukather: Electric Guitars; Bruce Gaitsch: Acoustic and Nylon-String Guitars; Remy Malo: Bass; Mickey Curry: Drums
Tracks 2, 3 and 10 produced by Patrick Leonard  Technical assistant to Mr. Leonard: David Channing.  Recorded by Ross Hogarth.  Mixed by Mick Guzauski (track 2) and Mike Shipley (tracks 3 and 10).  Patrick Leonard: Keyboards and Programming; James Harrah and David Channing (Channing on track 2 only): Electric Guitars; Dean Parks: Acoustic Guitars; Paul Bushnell: Bass; Vinnie Colaiuta: Drums; Luis Conte and Brian MacLeod (MacLeod also played drums on track 3): Percussion; Steven Tavaglione: Soprano Saxophone (track 2 only).
Tracks 4, 7, 9 and 12 produced by Walter Afanasieff.  Recorded by Dave Reitzas, David Gleeson and Bobbie Fernandez.  Mixed by Mick Guzauski, with assistance by Tom Bender.  Walter Afanasieff and Dan Shea: Keyboards, Drum and Rhythm Programming (note that track 12 features piano only); Michael Landau: Electric Guitars; Dean Parks: Acoustic Guitars
Track 5 produced by Evan Rogers and Carl Sturken.  Recorded by Al Hemberger; mixed by Mick Guzauski, with assistance by Tom Bender.  Marc Antoine: Guitars; Carl Sturken: Guitars, Keyboards and Drum Programming
Track 8 produced by Louis Biancaniello and Sam Watters.  Recorded and mixed by Mick Guzauski, with assistance by Tom Bender.  Louis Biancaniello: Keyboards and Programming; Chris Camozzi and Vernon "Ice" Black: Guitars
Track 11 produced by Mark Taylor and Brian Rawling.  Recorded by Mark Taylor and Glen Marchese.  Mixed by Mark Taylor.  Mark Taylor: Keyboards and programming.

Charts

Certifications

References

2000 albums
Lara Fabian albums
Albums produced by Patrick Leonard
Albums produced by Walter Afanasieff
Albums produced by Glen Ballard
Albums produced by Brian Rawling